Animation in Malaysia (known as Animasi in Malay) has origins in the puppetry style of wayang kulit, wherein the characters are controlled by the puppeteer, or Tok Dalang. Chinese shadow play inspired German filmmaker Lotte Reiniger to create the animated The Adventures of Prince Achmed in 1926 that was based on one of the stories in the 1001 Nights stories. Many of the world's animators have credited Prince Achmed`s recognisable style for generating their initial interest in animation as well as in their works.

Early Animation

Filem Negara Malaysia (Malayan Film Unit)
The Malayan Film Unit was created by the British colonialists in 1946 with the intent to produce documentaries and public service announcements of the government and later renamed Filem Negara Malaysia. A set designer working for the Unit named Anandam Xavier was asked to handle an animation project in 1961. Xavier set to work on the first in-country animation short subject "Hikayat Sang Kancil" until 1978, although the short would not see a release until 1983.

Animated Shorts
The coming years would see additional hand-drawn animated shorts: 1984`s Sang Kancil dan Monyet and a 1987 follow-up, Sang Kancil dan Buaya; 1985`s Gagak Yang Bijak; and Arnab Yang Sombong and Singa Yang Haloba both released in 1986, all written and directed by Hassan Abd. Muthalib. Live action films produced in Malaysia in the 1980s and 1990s began to feature animated sequences, particularly in the opening credit sequence of films like Mekanik, Mat Gelap and Yes, Tuan, all made by Hassan Muthalib.

Animation Houses
The surge in Malaysian animation products resulted in the founding of two animation studios: FilmArt, established in 1984 and Lensamation, which opened its doors in 1987. Having these production companies in the country led to the legitimisation of animation as an art form and career path, and training schools and programs were instituted. The year 1995 saw the debut of the first animated television series, Usop Sontorian.

Modernisation and Globalisation
The animation industry in Malaysia received some attention from Tun Mahathir bin Mohamad, the fourth Prime Minister of Malaysia with plans for rapidly modernising the country. This extended to the use of digital technology in production houses, predominantly the direct-to-system method of drawing into the computer pioneered by Kamn Ismail. The first computer-animated animation efforts in Malaysia were the 2000 film "Nien Resurrection" and an episode of the series "Skyland" conceived and produce by Young Jump Animation Sdn. Bhd. However, in the late 1990s, Kamn Ismail had already included 3D elements in his Keluang Man animation series.

This era also saw an increase in efforts to aggressively promote locally produced animation efforts. Since 2000, the Malaysian animation industry has gone far globally when Multimedia Digital Economy Corporation (MDEC) produced Saladin: The Animated Series for Al Jazeera Children's Channel. Since then, many Malaysian animation companies marketed their works to globally. Their animation has succeeded in promoting Malaysia globally by creating content that was based on Malaysian culture but having universal values.

Several Malaysian animation films and series that have hit global market are:
 Geng: The Adventure Begins animated film
 Upin & Ipin animated series
 Bola Kampung animated series
 Satria The Warriors of 7 Elements animated series
 Synostone animated series
 BoBoiBoy animated series
 Ejen Ali animated series
Currently, Malaysian animation are dominant and the largest one in ASEAN market, alongside Japanese and Western animation. Malaysia are regarded as the ASEAN hub for animation industry. Also, Malaysia became the first and only ASEAN country for its animated film to make it through the Academy Award nominations via Upin & Ipin: Keris Siamang Tunggal in 2020. This proved that Malaysia is now ready to compete with other dominant country in animation such as Japan and United States.

Malaysian animation also have their own brand, called #AniMy to representing Animasi Malaysia and Kontinjen Animasi, special for National Day.

The Role of Government
The Government of Malaysia, through its agencies, Multimedia Development Corporation and Malaysia Animation Creative Content Centre (MAC3) supports the industry by giving funding through grant scheme and providing world-class facilities to some key-players. The grants include Start-up Funds, Intellectual Property Grant Scheme and MAC3 Co-Production Fund.

Malaysia are one of the two countries in ASEAN that it's animation industry being provided fund by the government, the other one is Singapore.

MAC3 Co-Production Fund
This grant was launched in 2009 to support the creation and development or co-development of Intellectual Properties under the Animation, Games & Computer Graphics sectors of the creative cluster.

The grant is designed to help innovative and progressive local companies to co-produce animation and game development projects with reputable partners that will contribute to the overall development of the industry in Malaysia.

Foreign Influence on Malaysian Animation
Some of local animation has a tendency to copy foreign elements, especially anime. This can be seen in the design of TV animation series such as Anak-anak Sidek, Edi & Cici and Sang Wira. This is because, most of the animators were once trained by Japanese animators.

However, Kampung Boy, based on the characters of international-known cartoonist, Lat has its own identity. It is seen as the best animation that portrays Malaysian cultures in the eyes of its own creator. In the making of Kampung Boy, Lat was actively involved on the project.

Persatuan Animasi Malaysia (Animation Society of Malaysia)
Animation Society of Malaysia, ANIMAS is a non-profit government organisation that promotes animation in Malaysia.

History
ANIMAS was officially registered as an organisation on 29 May 2007.

The idea towards the foundation of ANIMAS was first discussed at the Hiroshima Animation Film Festival in 1997. Hassan Abd Muthalib, the director of Silat Legenda, the first feature animation film in Malaysia in 1998; Hisham Harun Hashim, producer and executive producer of the first Malaysian animated film, Silat Legenda and Kamn Ismail, director of Usop Sontorian, agreed to form ANIMAS.

The idea was later discussed in 2001 during a meeting with Hassan Abd Muthalib, James Ooi and Richard Ung Kok Kee at the office of James Ooi. A series of meetings to form ANIMAS began in April 2001 and the 1st pro-tem committee met at Cempaka Sari Room, FINAS (the National Film Development Corporation Malaysia), Ampang, Selangor on 17 May 2001.

Activities
ANIMAS was finally officially registered only on 29 May 2007. However, even before registration, ANIMAS began to play an active role in the industry. ANIMAS was part of the main committee organising the Malaysia Film Festival and many other events. Hassan Abd Muthalib has been invited to Japan and China to present papers on the Malaysian animation industry a number of times.

In 2004, a seminar was organised with the collaboration of the French Embassy, Goethe-Institut Malaysia and FINAS at Balai Senilukis Negara (National Visual Arts Gallery). This seminar - Animation Industry in Malaysia: Current Situation & New Challenges - brought together for the first time most of the animation companies and training institutions in Malaysia. Among the foreign speakers were Ms Tiziana Loschi, Director of the Annecy International Animation Film Festival (France); Gilbert Hus, a producer and Regis Ghezalbash, a producer/director (both from France); Georges LaCroix, the director of the animation series, Insektors (France) and Ulrich Wegenast, an animation academic and director (Germany).

Collaboration
In 2008, ANIMAS collaborated with The One Academy of Communication Design in Sunway to present Animation Veteran awards to two pioneers of animation in Malaysia – Goh Meng Huat (the first animator in Malaysia who had been with Filem Negara Malaysia) and also to actor/director, Mat Sentol (the first feature film animator). The presentation was part of the Digital Art Competition & Convention held at Mid Valley Megamall. Hassan also gave a Powerpoint presentation of the history and development of the Malaysian animation industry during the event.

Malaysian Animation Chronology
These are the major events in the Malaysian Animation.

1972: Selamat Hari Natal
1979: Hapuskan Nyamuk Aedes
1985: Sang Kancil & Buaya
1986: Gagak Yang Bijak
1986: Arnab Yang Sombong
1987: Singa Yang Haloba
1995: Usop Sontorian
1996: Keluang Man
1998: Frootees
1999: Kampong Boy
1999: Anak- Anak Sidek
1999: Sang Wira
2006: Bola Kampung
2007: Upin & Ipin
2011: BoBoiBoy
2016: Satria The Warriors of 7 Elements  
2014: The Amazing Awang Khenit
2015: Raja Pahat
2016: Ejen Ali
2016: Kazoops!
2019: Papa Pipi
2021: Mechamato
2022: Mechamato: The Movie
2023: Didi & Friends The Movie

Holidays
Due to Malaysia being a mainly Muslim-majority country, most animated show have Ramadan/Eid al-Fitr specials instead of Christmas.

Major Events in Malaysian Animation 

|-
|2014||
|-
|2015||

References

Further reading
The History of Malaysia Animation

 
Animation